The arthropod gap is an apparent gap in the arthropod fossil record used in the study of evolutionary biology. It still occurs in the early Carboniferous, coinciding and extending past the Romer's gap for tetrapods, who were newly arriving on land.

The discovery of the Devonian insect species Strudiella devonica in 2012, and dated to 370 million years ago, reduces a previous gap of 45 million years in the evolutionary history of insects, from 385 million to 325 million years ago. However, its affinity as insect is questioned later.

It is also sometimes known as the hexapoda gap.

See also 
 Evolution of insects
 Romer's gap

References 

Evolution of arthropods
Gaps in the fossil record